Vazashen is a village in the Ijevan Municipality of the Tavush Province of Armenia.

Toponymy 
The village was previously known as Lala Gegh, then Lali Gyugh. The name of Vazashen was chosen to reflect the local vineyard production (վազ/vaz 'grapevine' and շեն/shen 'village').

History 
Near Vazashen is the historical site of Khaghkhagh, the winter residence of the kings of Ancient Armenia, where Saint Vardan won his first military victory.

Gallery

References

External links 

Populated places in Tavush Province